Claus Mørch Sr. (16 April 1912 – 14 March 2004) was a Norwegian fencer. He competed in the individual and team épée events at the 1948 Summer Olympics. His son Claus Mørch Jr. fenced for Norway at the 1972 Summer Olympics and his granddaughter, Margrete Mørch, fenced at the 2000 Summer Olympics.

References

External links
 

1912 births
2004 deaths
Norwegian male épée fencers
Olympic fencers of Norway
Fencers at the 1948 Summer Olympics
Sportspeople from Oslo
20th-century Norwegian people